The 1906 Colorado Agricultural Aggies football team represented Colorado Agricultural College (now known as Colorado State University) in the Colorado Football Association (CFA) during the 1906 college football season.  In their first season under head coach Claude Rothgeb, the Aggies compiled a 1–2–1 record, tied for last place in the CFA, and were outscored by a total of 21 to 4.

Schedule

References

Colorado Agricultural
Colorado State Rams football seasons
Colorado Agricultural Aggies football